This is a list of buildings on Georgetown University campuses. Georgetown University's undergraduate campus and the medical school campus, together comprising the main campus, and the Law Center campus, are located within Washington, D.C.  The Main Campus is located in Georgetown, Washington, D.C. between Canal Road, P Street, and Reservoir Road. The Law Center campus is located in downtown DC on New Jersey Avenue, near Union Station.

List of buildings

Future buildings 
Cooper Field improvements, currently in its second phase of planning.
Boathouse, awaiting completion of city environmental survey.

References 

 
Georgetown University
Georgetown University